Jeelakarragudem is a village of Guntupalle village district, situated at a distance of 6.4-km from Kamavarapukota. The village is situated picturesquely amidst hills and contains the famous Buddhist Monuments, Guntupalle.

References

Buddhist sites in Andhra Pradesh
Villages in West Godavari district